Ecolab Inc. is an American corporation headquartered in Saint Paul, Minnesota. It develops and offers services, technology and systems that specialize in treatment, purification, cleaning and hygiene of water in a wide variety of applications. It helps organizations, both in private as well as public markets treat their water, for drinking use and for use in food, healthcare, hospitality-related safety and industry. Founded as Economics Laboratory in 1923 by Merritt J. Osborn, it was eventually renamed "Ecolab" in 1986.

History

Early years: 1923 - 1950s
Merritt J. "M.J." Osborn founded Economics Laboratory in 1923 with the tagline "Saving time, lightening labor and reducing costs to those we serve." The company's original product was Absorbit, a product supposedly designed to quickly clean carpets in hotel rooms. This was soon followed by Soilax, a dishwasher soap.

During the 1930s, the company expanded throughout the United States and sales reached US$5.4 million by the end of 1940s. It acquired the Magnus Company in the early 1950s, which gave the company access to Magnus's industrial specialty businesses - including pulp and paper, metalworking, transportation, and petrochemical processing.

Transition to a public corporation and expansion: 1950s - 1986
In the 1950s, international expansion of Economics Laboratory started with the establishment of its first overseas subsidiary in Sweden in 1956. It became a publicly traded corporation in 1957 and continued to expand during the 1960s and 1970s.  In 1979, it acquired Apollo Technologies, but in 1983 the acquired Apollo subsidiary was shut down. In 1984, Ecolab acquired pest elimination leader Lystads, Inc., of Grand Forks, North Dakota.

Ecolab Inc.: 1986 - 2000
In 1986, the company changed its name from Economics Laboratory to Ecolab Inc. and was listed on the New York Stock Exchange.

In 1987, the company formed a textile care division.

In 1987, Ecolab purchased the lawncare servicer provider ChemLawn for US$376 million. It sold the acquisition in 1992 to ServiceMaster for US$103 million as it couldn't turn ChemLawn into a profitable business.

Ecolab and the German fast-moving consumer goods firm Henkel KGaA formed a 50:50 European joint venture called 'Henkel-Ecolab' in 1991 to expand into European and Russian markets.

Ecolab continued to acquire companies in the 1990s, including Kay Chemical (1993), Australia-based Gibson Chemical Industries Ltd (1997), and GCS Service Inc (1998).

Ecolab Inc.: 2000 - Present 
In the mid-2000s, strategic acquisitions continued, and Ecolab diversified its portfolio of customer offerings by venturing into the food safety management business as well as a healthcare business unit.

In 2004, Douglas M. Baker, Jr. was named chief executive officer. In 2006, he also was named chairman of Ecolab's board of directors.

In 2005, the company opened a new global research, development, and engineering center in Eagan, Minnesota.

In 2006, Ecolab won the Black Pearl Award for Corporate Excellence in Food Safety and Quality, presented by the International Association of Food Protection (IAFP).

In 2007, Ecolab acquired Microtek Medical Holdings, Inc., expanding its infection prevention expertise and offerings to hospitals and other healthcare facilities.

In 2008, Henkel sold all of the 73 million shares, nearly a 29.5% stake it held in Ecolab, ending the two-decade-long partnership. The same year, Ecolab established Zurich as its Europe, the Middle East and Africa headquarters.

In July 2011, Ecolab announced a merger with Nalco Holding Company, Inc., an industrial water technology firm. In December 2011, Nalco, later renamed Nalco Water, became a wholly owned subsidiary of Ecolab after Ecolab completed the US$5.4 billion acquisition.

In May 2012, Microsoft co-founder Bill Gates, through his investment vehicles Cascade Investment and the Bill & Melinda Gates Foundation increased his stake of 10.8% in Ecolab to 25%.

In August 2012, Ecolab opened its Taicang, China, manufacturing plant. The facility, one of the company's largest, helped expand Ecolab's presence in Greater China and was the company's first plant to recycle 100% of its wastewater.

In October 2012, Ecolab entered an agreement to acquire Champion Technologies, a global specialty chemical company. The $2.2 billion transaction closed in April 2013.

In November 2014, Ecolab, working with TruCost, launched the Water Risk Monetizer. It provides an online, no-cost financial modeling tool to assess and monetize the risk of water scarcity. In November 2015, for $40.5 million, Ecolab acquired the U.S. operations of Swisher Hygiene, which provides hygiene and sanitizing solutions for the foodservice, hospitality, retail and healthcare markets.

In June 2016, Ecolab announced plans to acquire Laboratoires Anios, a leading European manufacturer and marketer of hygiene and disinfection products for the healthcare, food service, and food and beverage markets. Based in Lille, France, Anios served customers in 85 countries and had 2015 sales of approximately US$245 million. The US$800 million transaction closed on February 1, 2017.

In July 2016, Ecolab made a minority investment in Aquatech International, LLC of an undisclosed amount.

In August 2016, the company opened a Latin America regional headquarters in Miramar, Florida.

In October 2016, Ecolab acquired the assets of UltraClenz, a developer of electronic hand hygiene compliance monitoring systems and dispensers.

In March 2018, Bill Gates purchased $230 million in additional shares of Ecolab via Cascade Investments.

In October 2020, Christophe Beck was named the next CEO of Ecolab, effective January 1, 2021.

In August 2022, Bill Gates purchased additional stock through Cascade, though his overall stake dropped to 11%.

Operations
Ecolab employs approximately 47,000 people and operates in more than 170 countries. It is organized in the following geographical divisions:

 North America (based in St. Paul, Minnesota)
 Europe (based in Zurich, Switzerland)
 Middle East and Africa, including South Africa (based in Dubai, UAE)
 Asia Pacific (based in Singapore)
 Greater China (based in Shanghai)
 Latin America (based in Miramar, Florida)

Products and services
Ecolab helps organizations treat their water, not only for drinking directly, but also for use in food, healthcare, hospitality and industry.

The company's food safety services provide consulting to restaurants, hospitals, food retailers and food & beverage manufacturing facilities. It is also a supplier of chemistries used by beef and poultry processors to reduce pathogens, such as E. coli and salmonella in uncooked beef and poultry.

See also 
Nalco Holding Company

References

External links

 Archival records of Ecolab at the Minnesota Historical Society

Chemical companies of the United States
Chemical companies established in 1923
Companies listed on the New York Stock Exchange
Business services companies established in 1923
Manufacturing companies based in Saint Paul, Minnesota
1923 establishments in Minnesota